Scheller is an unincorporated community in Jefferson County, Illinois, United States. Scheller has a post office with ZIP code 62883.

Notable person
Carl Kabat (1933-2022), Roman Catholic priest and activist, was born on a farm in Scheller.

References

Unincorporated communities in Jefferson County, Illinois
Unincorporated communities in Illinois